Allotinus taras is a butterfly in the family Lycaenidae. It was described by Doherty in 1889. It is found in Burma.

References

Butterflies described in 1889
Allotinus
Butterflies of Asia